The canton of Belmont-de-la-Loire is a French former administrative division located in the department of Loire and the Rhone-Alpes region. It was disbanded following the French canton reorganisation which came into effect in March 2015. It consisted of 9 communes, which joined the canton of Charlieu in 2015. It had 5,679 inhabitants (2012).

The canton comprised the following communes:

Arcinges
Belleroche
Belmont-de-la-Loire
Le Cergne
Cuinzier
Écoche
La Gresle
Saint-Germain-la-Montagne
Sevelinges

See also
Cantons of the Loire department

References

Former cantons of Loire (department)
2015 disestablishments in France
States and territories disestablished in 2015